Earl Gilbert "Butch" Graves Jr. (born January 5, 1962) is an American businessman and retired basketball player. Born in Brooklyn, New York, he is a Scarsdale High School graduate.

Background
Graves, the son of Barbara Graves, and Black Enterprise founder Earl G. Graves Sr., attended Yale University and earned an MBA from Harvard University.  While at Yale he was a member of Skull and Bones and captained the college basketball team. He currently is the all-time leading scorer in Yale men's basketball history and third all-time in Ivy League. He was drafted into the NBA by the Philadelphia 76ers and later played briefly for the Cleveland Cavaliers (1984–85). He was also drafted by the Dallas Cowboys.

Graves has worked for Morgan Stanley, as president and CEO of Earl G. Graves Publishing Company, publisher of Black Enterprise magazine, and director of Autozone, Inc.

In 1995, Graves was detained and searched by two New York Metro-North Police looking for a suspect who did not resemble Graves in any way except race.  The police department publicly apologized and Metro-North Railroad purchased ads featuring a printed apology in three New York newspapers, including The New York Times.

On July 22, 2009, Graves stated to the media that "there's nothing post-racial about U.S.", as he responded to the arrest of Harvard professor Henry Louis Gates. In February 2021, Graves said that the biggest challenge for African-American entrepreneurs is scale, and that 96 percent of Black-owned businesses are sole-proprietorships. "We need to take our respective resources [among multiple founders and investors] and work together to build companies that can attract major customers. Microbusinesses can’t do that on their own."

Notes

References
 "Earl G. Graves Jr." Who's Who Among African Americans, 20th edn. Gale, 2007.

External links
 
 
 
 
 

1962 births
Living people
Basketball players from New York City
African-American basketball players
Cleveland Cavaliers players
Harvard Business School alumni
People from Scarsdale, New York
Philadelphia 76ers draft picks
Point guards
Shooting guards
Sportspeople from Brooklyn
Sportspeople from Westchester County, New York
Yale Bulldogs men's basketball players
Scarsdale High School alumni
Morgan Stanley employees
American men's basketball players
21st-century African-American people
20th-century African-American sportspeople